Sheepstown Church is a medieval church and National Monument in County Kilkenny, Ireland.

Location

History

The church at Sheepstown is dedicated to St Muicín, bishop and confessor (d. 630). The stone church was built during the 12th or 13th century, at a period when the Irish church was moving from a monastic to a diocesan setup.

Church

The church is Hiberno-Romanesque and simple in design. The west doorway has simple bead moulding, as do the four corners of the gables. The door in the south may have led to the sacristy. High in the northwest corner is a corbel called the "clock-stone", perhaps the gnomon of a sundial.

References

Churches in County Kilkenny
Archaeological sites in County Kilkenny
National Monuments in County Kilkenny
Former churches in the Republic of Ireland